David Woodbury is a New Hampshire politician.

Education
Woodbury earned a BA from University of Pennsylvania in 1966 and a JD from University of Michigan.

Career
Woodbury has been a member of the New Hampshire Bar since 1969. Woodbury served on the New Boston Conservation Commission from 1978 to 1990. In 1984, Woobury was a delegate to the New Hampshire Constitutional Convention. Woodbury served on the New Boston Solid Waste Committee from 1991 to 1994. Woodbury served as a New Boston selectman from 2001 to 2010.

On November 6, 2012, Woodbury was elected to the New Hampshire House of Representatives where he represented the Hillsborough 5 district until 2016. On November 8, 2016, Woodbury was not reelected to this position. On November 6, 2018, Woodbury regained his prior seat, and has been representing the Hillsborough 5 distinct ever since. He is a Democrat.

Personal life
Woodbury resides in New Boston, New Hampshire. Woodbury is married and has three children.

References

Living people
New Hampshire lawyers
People from New Boston, New Hampshire
University of Pennsylvania alumni
University of Michigan alumni
Democratic Party members of the New Hampshire House of Representatives
21st-century American politicians
20th-century American lawyers
Year of birth missing (living people)